Index.hr is a Croatian tabloid online newspaper, launched in December 2002 and based in Zagreb. It was founded by Matija Babić and was originally designed as a news aggregation website, providing news content from Croatia, Serbia and Bosnia and Herzegovina. The website quickly grew in popularity and over time, more original content was produced by its growing staff until it became a popular media outlet in its own right. It has been described as having a "reputation of an independent, liberal, and strongly opposition outlet" with a "strong liberal bias". 

The news site covers politics, business, sports, show business, and features columns covering everything from gossip to political commentary, self-credited for exposing many scandals which "changed Croatia". According to Alexa Internet in 2010, Index.hr is one of the top sites in Croatia, and in Bosnia and Herzegovina. , it is the leading Croatian news website. Despite its popularity however, it is among the least trusted Croatian news brands.

Court trials
In 2004, Croatian singer Severina sued Index.hr for publishing naked photographs of her from a sex tape she made. The part of the lawsuit dealing with copyright infringement was dismissed, but Index was ordered to pay the singer 100,000 kuna as compensation for violation of privacy. In 2012, enforcement action was initiated against Index.hr for failing to pay the compensation which had grown to 200,000 kunas with interest and court costs. In 2014, after ten years of court proceedings against Index.hr without compensation, Severina was granted the status of intellectual proprietor of Index's brand and logo through enforcement action, though the court thereafter ruled that compensation could not be sought from the publisher's account.

In 2014, the then Minister of Finance, Slavko Linić, initiated two lawsuits against Index promocija d.o.o. (Index.hr publisher) and Index.hr for damages valued at 210,000 kuna, which were dismissed at the Rijeka County Court for first instance proceedings.

In 2016, Index.hr and its journalists received criticism and death threats after publishing a controversial article regarding the veneration of the remains of Croatian Catholic saint Leopold Mandić. The Croatian Journalists' Association (HND) condemned both the words used by the site, which they described as "deeply insulting and disparaging" to believers, as well as the threats made against the newspaper. The Croatian Journalists and Publicists association (HNiP) accused the Council for Electronic Media (VEM) of "unethical ideological bias" for not holding the publisher of Index.hr (Index promocija d.o.o.) responsible and its "contextual defense of insulting religion and the religious feelings of Croatian citizens of the Roman Catholic faith". In 2017, five civil associations lost a first-instance court case against Index.hr in which they alleged that the text discriminated against Catholics. The judge accepted Index.hr's defense that believers were not the target and that the article was satirical criticism.

Bankruptcy
In February 2014, after a long period of account blocking due to amassed debt, the Croatian finance agency Fina rejected the proposal for a pre-bankruptcy settlement of 2.4 million kuna by the companies Index portal d.o.o. and Prva stanica d.o.o. related to the business of the brand, owned by Babić. Later that same year Babić was also accused of using fictitious contracts with Vana Šalov Violić to sell his damaged company for around 2.8 million kuna. In April 2015 he was sentenced to one year in prison at the Zagreb County Court after pleading guilty and settling with the prosecution. The one-year prison sentence was replaced by community service, and he was fined 300,000 kuna. According to the verdict, Babić and Šalov Violić had to pay about 1 million kuna to the state budget, and about 600,000 kuna to the company they damaged. In 2016, Sport Index d.o.o., another company related to Index.hr and Babić, was opening bankruptcy proceedings with an established debt of over 290,000 kuna.

References

External links
 
Index.hr  at Alexa.com

Croatian news websites
Internet properties established in 2002
2002 establishments in Croatia
Mass media in Zagreb
Croatian-language websites